Peter Stebbing (14 May 1914 – August 1991) was a British painter. His work was part of the painting event in the art competition at the 1948 Summer Olympics.

References

1914 births
1991 deaths
20th-century British painters
British male painters
Olympic competitors in art competitions
People from Chertsey
20th-century British male artists